The 2020 FIM CEV Moto3 Junior World Championship was the ninth CEV Moto3 season and the seventh under the FIM.

Calendar
The calendar was published in November 2019; a revised schedule was released on 16 June 2020 as a result of delays caused by the COVID-19 pandemic.

Calendar changes
The round at Albacete was replaced with a round at Portimão.
The round supporting the French Grand Prix at Le Mans was replaced with a round at Misano supporting the San Marino Grand Prix.
Due to the COVID-19 pandemic, the rounds at Barcelona and Misano were dropped.

Entry list

All entries used Dunlop tyres.

Championship standings
Scoring system
Points were awarded to the top fifteen finishers. A rider had to finish the race to earn points.

Riders' championship

Constructors' championship

References

External links 
Official website

FIM CEV Moto3 Junior World Championship
CEV Moto3